Duirinish is a settlement in Lochalsh near Plockton in Ross-shire, Scottish Highlands and is in the Scottish council area of Highland.

References

Populated places in Lochalsh